Glace Bay (Scottish Gaelic: Glasbaidh) is a community in the eastern part of the Cape Breton Regional Municipality in Nova Scotia, Canada.  It forms part of the general area referred to as Industrial Cape Breton.

Formerly an incorporated town (1901–1995), the municipal government in Glace Bay was dissolved and the community was amalgamated into the larger regional municipality. Prior to amalgamation, Glace Bay had been the province's fourth largest urban area and the largest town in Nova Scotia by population.

Neighbouring communities include Reserve Mines, Dominion, and Tower Road.

History
As early as the 1720s, the French inhabited the area to supply Fortress of Louisbourg with coal. They named the location baie de Glace (literally, Bay of Ice) because of the sea ice which filled the ocean each winter. In 1748, after the capture of Fortress Louisbourg, the British constructed Fort William at Table Head in order to protect a mine that produced coal to supply the Louisbourg garrison. The fort itself was a blockhouse, brought from Boston, with a palisade. When Cape Breton Island was returned to French control, Fort William continued in service until 1752 when it was destroyed by fire.

More permanent settlement of Glace Bay probably can be dated from 1818 when Walter Blackett obtained a grant of land on the south side of the Bay. Coal mining existed on a small scale until the 1860s, when four mines were in operation within the future town boundaries. These included the Hub, Harbour, Caledonia and Glace Bay Collieries. The first large mine, the Hub Shaft of Glace Bay opened in 1861 and a total of 12 mines in Glace Bay were in operation. Following the formation of the Dominion Coal Company in 1893, the coal mining industry expanded significantly in what was to become Glace Bay with the opening of several new mines. In 1894, the government gave exclusive mining rights to the Dominion Coal Company.

Small communities grew up around the mines and by 1901 they came together to form the Town of Glace Bay. At the time of incorporation, the population was 6,945. During the early 20th century, mining companies recruited in the American South for workers, attracting African Americans from Mississippi. By the 1940s, the figure exceeded 28,000 and Glace Bay became Canada's largest town (in population). At one time, the town had 12 collieries but none remains. Because of this industrial decline, jobs left and the core population decreased to 16,984 as of 2001. The city has been dissolved/deincorporated since municipal amalgamation in 1995, which formed the Cape Breton Regional Municipality.

Economy

Glace Bay was once a coal mining town. In 1860, the Glace Bay Mining Company was formed and it operated two mines. The first large colliery, the Hub Shaft, opened in 1861. Large-scale mining commenced in 1893 after exclusive mining rights were granted to the Dominion Coal Company. Glace Bay was incorporated as a town on January 18, 1901. At its high point the company operated eleven mines in all, and was responsible for 40% of Canada's coal production.  Coal was transported on the Sydney and Louisburg Railway to both of those ports for shipping. The S & L Railway's main operations, including the roundhouse and machine shops were located in Glace Bay. Glace Bay's extensive coal and rail operations made the town the industrial center of Cape Breton. As coal mining became less important, the mines were closed until, in 1984 Colliery No. 26 was closed by the Cape Breton Development Corporation. Many residents of Glace Bay started to work at the two other coal mines in the area: Prince Colliery in Point Aconi and Phalen Colliery and Lingan Colliery in Lingan. However, coal mining continued its decline with Lingan closing in the mid-1990s, followed by Phalen in 1999 and Prince in 2001.

Fishing was also an important industry throughout the 20th century. However, by the 1990s fish stocks were so depleted that the fishery was closed. Some fish processing still occurs here.

Present day

The former town of Glace Bay has a population of slightly fewer than 20,000 people.  In 2001, a call centre operated by Stream Global Services, using post-industrialization subsidies opened.

The Swiss mining consortium Xstrata was the primary partner in the Donkin Coal Development Alliance, which won the rights to develop an abandoned mine site in the nearby community of Donkin. Currently, the mine is owned by Kameron Collieries, a subsidiary of Cline Group LLC which purchased the operation in 2014–2015. Coal production commenced in February 2016 and by the fall of 2018, the mine had 120 employees.

Historical features and places

Marconi National Historic Site
The Marconi National Historic Site of Canada is located at Table Head in Glace Bay. Parks Canada maintains an interpretive centre at the site honouring the role of Guglielmo Marconi in the development of radio communications. In December 1902, Marconi transmitted the first complete messages to Poldhu from stations at Glace Bay, Nova Scotia.

Marconi chose this site for its elevated flat expanse and unobstructed view out over the ocean. Some of the concrete footings for the massive towers can still be seen on the grounds.  Marconi built a much larger wireless site west of here then known as Marconi Towers.  In 1907 he initiated the first permanent transatlantic wireless service from Marconi Towers to its companion site in Clifden, Ireland.

Cape Breton Miners Museum 
The Cape Breton Miners Museum is located on top of the Ocean Deep Colliery which is only 1 kilometer from downtown Glace Bay. The museum is privately ran and relies on donations and governement grants for its operations. During the summer season, the museum offers a walking underground mine tour with a retired coal miner, and a virtual simulator tour of an underground mine. The museum is also home to The Men of the Deeps choir.

Geography

Landscape
The local landscape is heavily forested and hilly.  Some of the low-lying areas at the bottom of hills consist of marshes and bogs. There are rocky cliffs around the ocean along most of the coast and erosion continues to be a problem in some areas; part of North Street fell into the ocean due to erosion and the street was split into Upper and Lower North Street.

Many areas surrounding former coal mines are experiencing subsidence as the old mine shafts collapse.  There are several brownfields around the community at former industrial sites.

Flora and fauna
Glace Bay has a large amount of forests and swamp surrounding the town and within the town limits. Mammals present in Glace Bay include squirrels, rabbits, fox, deer, mice, muskrats, cats, dogs,  and coyotes. Bird species include ducks, great horned owls, Canada geese, crows, gulls, and pigeons. Pheasants are occasionally seen around wooded areas. Smaller birds such as robins, black capped chickadees, and sparrows are also present. Frogs, salamanders, and snakes are also common in Glace Bay.

Glace Bay and the surrounding areas are heavily forested. Common deciduous trees in Glace Bay include poplar, maples, and birches. Oaks, elms and beech trees are also present but they are less common. Common conifers include spruce and balsam with some pine and tamaracks present as well.

The introduced Asian plants of Japanese and Giant Knotweed are common throughout the town and surrounding woodlands and are colloquially known as "elephant ears".

Climate
Glace Bay experiences a cool summer, and windy, wet and stormy winter, version of a humid continental climate (Köppen Dfb) that is significantly moderated by the community's proximity to the Atlantic Ocean.

Because of its close proximity to the Atlantic Ocean, Glace Bay, like all of Cape Breton Island, experiences strong seasonal lag. The ocean does not reach its maximum temperature until mid August. It usually stays there until early September. This makes August the hottest month in Glace Bay rather than July which is usually the hottest in most northern continental climates. February is also the coldest month on average rather than January.

Politics
Federally, Glace Bay is located in the riding of Cape Breton–Canso, currently held by Liberal MP Mike Kelloway. Provincially, the riding of Glace Bay-Dominion is currently held by Progressive Conservative MLA John White who was elected in the 2021 Nova Scotia provincial election. The riding had been held previously by Liberal MLA Geoff MacLellan who did not re-offer.

Mayors of Glace Bay
While Glace Bay was a town, the following people were its mayor:
 David M. Burchell 1901–1907
 John Carey Douglas 1907–1910
 Henry MacDonald 1910–1912
 Gordon S. Harrington 1912–1915
 Dan Cameron 1915–1916
 Angus J. MacDonald 1917
 Alonzo O'Neill 1918–1920
 E. MacK Forbes 1920–1921
 Dan W. Morrison 1921–1933
 Charles MacVicar 1933–1934
 Dan W. Morrison 1934–1950
 Dan A. MacDonald 1950–1970
 Dan A. Munroe 1970–1981
 Bruce A. Clark  1981–1988
 Donald MacInnis 1988–1995

Notable people

 Dave Amadio, NHL hockey player, played for the Los Angeles Kings.
 Vivian Berkeley, award-winning blind lawn bowler.
 Linda Bond, former General of The Salvation Army.
 Gerald Butts, Canadian political consultant.
 John Bernard Croak, war hero, WW1, recipient of the Victoria Cross.
 Aselin Debison, musician.
 Fred Dickson,  Canadian lawyer, politician, and a Conservative member of the Senate of Canada.
 Doug Doull, NHL hockey player, played for Boston Bruins and Washington Capitals.
 Clarie Gillis, Member of Parliament, Cape Breton South, 1940–1957.
 Gordon Sidney Harrington, former mayor and former premier of Nova Scotia.
 Andy Hogan, Member of Parliament, Cape Breton—East Richmond, 1974–1980.
 Ron James, comedian.
 Drake Jensen, country music singer.
 Pat MacAdam, Author, advisor of Prime Minister Brian Mulroney.
 Allister MacGillivray, Canadian singer/songwriter, guitarist, and music historian.
 Henry Poole MacKeen, Lieutenant Governor of Nova Scotia, 1963 to 1968.
 MacLean & MacLean, comedic team.
 Hugh MacLennan, novelist.
 Matt Minglewood, musician.
 John W. Morgan, former Mayor of CBRM.
 Marty O'Donnell, Olympic boxer.
 Daniel Petrie, Hollywood film director.
 Gerard Phalen, senator.
 Logan Shaw, NHL hockey player for the Ottawa Senators, 76th overall pick, 2011 NHL Entry Draft.
 Sandy Snow, played three games in the NHL with the Detroit Red Wings
 Doug Sulliman, NHL hockey player, 1979 New York Rangers 13th overall draft pick.
 Nick Wall, jockey.

Attractions
 Savoy Theatre
 Cape Breton Miners Museum
 Marconi Museum
 Miners Village
 Renwick Brook Park
 Queen Elizabeth Park
 Glace Bay Heritage Museum
 John Bernard Croak Memorial Park

See also
 Reserve Mines
 Dominion
 Cape Breton Island
 Province of Cape Breton

References

Notes

Citations

External links
 Cape Breton Regional Municipality

General Service Areas in Nova Scotia
Communities in the Cape Breton Regional Municipality
Former towns in Nova Scotia
Mining communities in Nova Scotia
1785 establishments in Nova Scotia
Populated places disestablished in 1995